Poland is a country in Central Europe.

Poland may also refer to:

Historical political entities
Duchy of Poland, a duchy existing from around 960 to 1025
Kingdom of Poland, a kingdom existing from 1025 to 1031
Duchy of Poland, a duchy existing from 1031 to 1076
Kingdom of Poland, a kingdom existing from 1076 to 1079
Duchy of Poland, a duchy existing from 1079 to 1138
Duchy of Poland, a confederal duchy existing from 1138 to 1227
Kingdom of Poland, a kingdom in Greater Poland existing from 1295 to 1296, under the rule of Przemysł II
Kingdom of Poland, a confederal duchy existing from 1300 to 1320
United Kingdom of Poland, a kingdom existing from 1320 to 1386
Crown of the Kingdom of Poland, a kingdom, that from 1385 to 1569 was an independent country, and from 1569 to 1795, was a member state of the Polish–Lithuanian Commonwealth
Polish–Lithuanian Commonwealth, a federal-state existing from 1596 to 1795
Congress Poland, a kingdom existing from 1815 to 1867/1915, under the control of Russian Empire
Kingdom of Poland, a rebel state during the November Uprising, existing from 1830 to 1831, 
Polish-Lithuanian-Ruthenian Commonwealth, a rebel state during the January Uprising, existing from 1863 to 1865
Kingdom of Poland, a client state of German Empire existing from 1917 to 1918
Second Polish Republic, a republic existing from 1918 to 1939
Polish government-in-exile, a government-in-exile of Poland, existing from 1939–1990
Polish Underground State, an underground state operating on the territories of the former Second Polish Republic during World War II
 Provisional Government of the Republic of Poland, a provisional government existing from 1944 to 1945
 Provisional Government of National Unity, a provisional government existing from 1945 to 1947
 Polish People's Republic, a satellite state of Soviet Union, existing from 1947 to 1989
 Third Republic of Poland, a republic existing from 1989

Places

Kiribati
 Poland, Kiribati

United States
 Poland, Indiana
 Poland, Maine
 Poland, Chautauqua County, New York
 Poland, Herkimer County, New York
 Poland, Ohio
 Poland Township, Mahoning County, Ohio
 Poland, Wisconsin

Other uses
 Poland (album), a 1984 album by Tangerine Dream
 Poland (European Parliament constituency)
 Poland (novel), a 1983 novel by James A. Michener
 Poland (sculpture), a 1966 work by artist Mark di Suvero
 "Poland" (song), a 2022 song by Lil Yachty
 Poland (surname)
 Poland syndrome, a rare birth defect

See also
 
 Polish (disambiguation)